Silas Howard is an American director, writer, and actor. His first feature film was By Hook or by Crook in 2001 with Harry Dodge, and he earned an MFA in directing at UCLA. He began directing episodes during the second season of Transparent, making him the show's first trans director.

Early life  
Howard grew up in south Vermont. He arrived in San Francisco in the early 1990s. Howard played guitar for Tribe 8, a queer punk rock band originating in the San Francisco area. In San Francisco, he and Harry Dodge, a former band member, opened Red Dora's Bearded Lady Café, where artists displayed their art.

Career
In 2001, Howard and Harry Dodge again wrote, directed and acted in By Hook or by Crook. The film depicts the tale of two unlikely friends who commit petty crimes as they search for a path to understanding themselves and the outside world. "We totally home-schooled it, we made this feature film without having made a short or anything, because we're like, we have the urgent need to tell this story, to have these different faces on the screen." Howard later earned an MFA in directing at UCLA in 2008. He currently is a visiting lecturer at Cornell University.

Howard was the first trans director for Transparent. The creator Joey Soloway wanted trans directors to tell their own stories. He directed the episodes "Bulnerable" (2015), "When the Battle Is Over", and "Just the Facts" (both in 2016). In September 2017's article in LGBT Weekly, one writer speaks of Howard as:

As of early 2017, Howard had begun work on his third feature film A Kid Like Jake starring Claire Danes, Jim Parsons, Octavia Spencer and Transparent actress Amy Landecker. The film premiered at the Sundance Film Festival in 2018.

In June 2019, to mark the 50th anniversary of the Stonewall Riots, sparking the start of the modern LGBTQ rights movement, Queerty named him one of the Pride50 “trailblazing individuals who actively ensure society remains moving towards equality, acceptance and dignity for all queer people.

Filmography

Director 
 Darby and the Dead (2022)
 A League of Their Own (2022 TV series)
 Grand Army (2020 TV series)
 Everything's Gonna Be Okay (2020 TV series)
 Dickinson (2019-21 TV series, 9 episodes)
 The Affair (2019 TV series, 1 episode)
 Tales of the City - (2019 miniseries, 2 episodes)
 High Maintenance (2019 TV series, 1 episode)
 Pose (2018 TV series, 1 episode)
 Step Up: High Water (2018 TV series, 1 episode)
 A Kid Like Jake - (2018)
 More Than T (2017)
 This Is Us - (2016 TV series, 1 episode)
 The Fosters (2016 TV series, 1 episode)
 Faking It - (2016 TV series, 1 episode)
 Transparent - (2015-16 TV series) 
 Sticks and Stones - (2014 short) 
 Golden Age of Hustlers - (2014 Video short) 
 Hudson Valley Ballers - (2013-15 TV series)
 Valencia: The Movie/S - (2013) 
 Sunset Stories - 2012 
 Brainstorm - 2009 (TV Series) 
 Blink - 2007 (Short) 
 How Do I Say This? - (2007 TV Series) 
 Zero to Hero - (2006 Video Short) 
 What I Love About Dying - (2006 Documentary short) 
 Frozen Smile - (2005 Short) 
 By Hook or by Crook - 2001

Writer 
 Sticks and Stones - 2014 (Short) 
 Blink - 2009 (Short) (Screenplay) 
 How Do I Say This? 2007 (TV Series - 1 episode) 
 Zero to Hero - 2006 (Video Short) (Story) 
 Frozen Smile - 2005 (Short) 
 By Hook or by Crook - 2001

Actor 
 Happy Birthday, Marsha! (2016 Short) - Stonewall Manager 
 Don't Mess with Texas (Short) - Al 
 The Perfect Ones (Short) - Punk Gang Member 
 By Hook or by Crook (2001) - Shy (Lead Role) 
 Blue Diary (Short) - Narrator
 Framing Agnes (2022)

Awards and nominations

Won 
 Seattle Lesbian & Gay Film Festival  - 2001 / Award for excellence -Best female director:  By Hook or by Crook (shared with Harry Dodge), Best Narrative Feature By Hook or by Crook (2001) (shared with Harry Dodge)
 L.A. Outfest 2001 / Grand Jury Award  -Outstanding Screenwriting: By Hook or by Crook (shared with Harry Dodge)
 Paris International Lesbian and Feminist Film Festival - 2002 / Audience Award - Best Film By Hook or by Crook (shared with Harry Dodge)
 Philadelphia International Gay & Lesbian Film Festival - 2002 / Jury Prize Best Feature  - Lesbian: By Hook or by Crook (shared with Harry Dodge)
 South by Southwest Film Festival - 2002 / Audience Award  - Narrative Feature: By Hook or by Crook (shared with Harry Dodge)
 CAMMFest - 2013 / Emerging Filmmaker Award - Sunset Stories (shared with Ernesto Foronda)

Nominated 
 VC FilmFest- Los Angeles Asian Pacific Film Festival - 2012 / Grand Jury Award -Best Narrative Feature: Sunset Stories (shared with Ernesto Foronda)
 South by Southwest Film Festiva - 2012 / Audience Award - Emerging Visions: Sunset Stories (shared with Ernesto Foronda)

See also
 List of transgender film and television directors
 CAAMFest - 2013 / Jury Award -Best Narrative - Sunset Stories (2012) (shared with Ernesto Foronda)

References

External links 
 Official website
 

American film directors
Transgender artists
Living people
American punk rock guitarists
LGBT film directors
LGBT television directors
American LGBT musicians
American television directors
University of California, Los Angeles alumni
Year of birth missing (living people)
Transgender male musicians